Freddie Welsh (born Frederick Hall Thomas; 5 March 1886 – 29 July 1927) was a Welsh World boxing champion. The lightweight boxer was born in Pontypridd, Wales, nicknamed the "Welsh Wizard". Brought up in a tough mining community, Welsh left a working-class background to make a name for himself in America. He turned professional as a boxer in Philadelphia in 1905, and spent the best part of his career fighting in the United States.

Welsh spent much of his career chasing the world championship title, held in turn by Battling Nelson, Ad Wolgast and Willie Ritchie, failing through a series of events to meet each until a successful encounter with Ritchie in July 1914, when he finally became world lightweight champion. Welsh held the title until 1917 when he lost to Benny Leonard, though he continued to fight sparingly until 1922. During his career, he fought in more than 160 professional bouts, suffering defeat on just 5 occasions.

A keen follower of Bernarr Macfadden's physical culture, Welsh believed in exercise and healthy living and was a non-smoker and a vegetarian. In the years following the end of his career, bad business choices cost him his fortune, and after numerous health problems he died in poverty in 1927.

Boxing career

Early life and amateur career
Freddie Welsh was born in Pontypridd on 5 March 1886, to John Thomas and his wife Elizabeth Thomas (née Hall). In the late 19th century, Pontypridd was a growing coal mining town, which attracted not only those wishing to make a living in the mines, but also middle-class professionals who saw an opportunity to make a living in a thriving community. Welsh's father was one such commercial immigrant, setting up a business on Taff Street as an auctioneer. Welsh's parents moved into 17 Morgan Street in the town, where Welsh was born. He had two younger siblings, a brother, Arthur Stanley and a sister, Edith Kate. Unlike most boxers of the period, Welsh had a privileged upbringing, at the age of four he attended Mr Mclune's Grammar School in Pontypridd and was privately educated at Long Ashton College in Clifton, Bristol. A few months after Welsh was born, his mother persuaded her husband to buy the Bridge Inn Hotel on Berw Road, and the family moved there. Welsh's mother was the daughter of a hotelier from Merthyr, and the Bridge Inn was her responsibility, as John Thomas was often away from home. When Welsh was ten, his father died. His mother, faced with running the hotel alone, sent Kate and Stanley to an aunt in Merthyr, while Welsh was sent to his maternal grandfather in Radyr. After a year, suffering from homesickness, Welsh returned home to Pontypridd. His mother later remarried, to Richard Williams, an innkeeper from Aberdare.

When Welsh left school at the age of 14, he took up work as a boilerman (the 1901 census, when he was 15, has him recorded as an apprentice mechanical engineer) finding work with Llewellyn & Cubbitt of Pentre, Rhondda. At the age of 16 he and three friends decided to find a new life in Canada. They set sail from Liverpool to Vancouver arriving in January 1903, but although his companions were able to find work, Welsh struggled to hold down any steady jobs. It was in Canada that he took a serious interest in bodybuilding and became a firm advocate of Bernarr Macfadden's physical culture regime. After a year Welsh was again homesick and borrowed enough money to return to Britain, but with only $10 he was forced to travel as a worker on a cattle-boat.

With his newfound physical fitness he entered the boxing ring undertaking amateur fights in Scotland, far away from Wales to prevent his mother discovering his passion for fighting. After twelve months he raised the money needed to return to the America, travelling to New York on the Baltic on her maiden voyage on 29 June 1904.

Welsh failed to find steady work in the States, and although his mother thought he was earning a regular wage and living comfortably, Welsh was actually taking any casual work that was offered him. Initially he rode the rails to the Dakotas to labour in the farm fields, before heading to New York City working long hours as a dishwasher or banner bearer. When Welsh was mugged while sleeping at a cheap hotel, he was given a job as a porter by the sympathetic hotel manager.

His first job in New York was as a boxing instructor in one of Bernarr Macfadden institutes. He was allowed to sleep in the gym, was given all his meals, plus $1 salary a day. It was as an instructor he first met his future wife, Brahna Weinstein, a Jewish Russian girl who anglicised her name to Fanny Weston when her family moved to the East Side.

He then successfully applied to an advertisement for a "smart, active young man who can box" at a down town gym, Knipe's Institute. Welsh subsidised his work as a trainer, as a boxing instructor and training director at Brown's Gymnasium. When hard times hit the gym, he was put on half time subsidising his earnings as a snow shoveller in Harlem. Welsh then found work at a well-known New York gymnasium for $8 a day, the wage barely paid his meals but he took the job to learn the boxing profession.

Despite going days without eating, and having to sleep on the wrestling mats at the gym, he refused to turn professional, partially to preserve his amateur status and he also did not want his mother to discover he was earning a living as a boxer. When friends who knew him from his gym work, and seeing him struggle to pay for a decent meal, asked why he didn't take up the nightly paid 'private' fights, Welsh initially refused. Despite his misgivings, the next day Welsh took up the offer and knocked out Kid Allen in a third round bout. This was followed with wins over Johnny Mezier, Young Peterson and Jack Cameron. With his financial issues resolved and being able to pay for steady meals, at the age of 19, Welsh decided to turn professional.

Early professional career, 1905–1906
Still with dreams of becoming a culture expert, he moved to Philadelphia to become an instructor at Herman's Institute, while Fanny stayed in New York to finish her studies. Before his first professional fight, Welsh decided to change his name, fearing he may fail and that his mother would find out he was boxing. He first chose Fred Cymry, Cymry meaning Welsh, but on writing to Fanny, she suggested that 'Welsh' would be less confusing. Welsh took Jack Clancy on as his American manager, and on 21 December 1905 he experienced his first professional bout. His first opponent was Young Williams, and the two novices fought at the Broadway Athletic Club of Philadelphia. Welsh won by knockout in the third round, and was booked to return to the club for his second fight in January. He went six rounds with Johnny Keely on 25 January, with a 'no-decision' verdict, the standard practice in Philadelphia for full-distance fights at the time, given to the fight. His next match saw him stop Eddie Fay in the sixth, and with this promising start to his career, the Broadway Athletic Club lined up a more challenging opponent, journeyman Tommy Feltz. The fight went all six rounds, and although Feltz was past his best, he was expected to win the bout; so the result, given to Welsh by the Philadelphia Item, was seen as an upset. From that fight, Welsh started to take more frequent matches, sometimes accepting two bouts a week to build up his experience and stamina. In March 1906, he faced four opponents, defeating Tommy Love and Kid Stinger (both 'no-decision', but given by the Philadelphia Item) and then a points win over Eddie Lenny, followed by a draw with Johnny Dohan. The Lenny result was the first of eight bouts to which the Philadelphia Item failed to give Welsh a victory, though seven of them were 'no-decision' verdicts on the night. The seven matches after Dohan were Billy Maharg, who took the fight decisively on points, then Frank Carsey, followed by three experienced fighters, Jimmy Devine, Tommy Love and Matty Baldwin; the last two opponents on this losing streak were Philadelphians Billy Willis and Tim Callahan.

On 12 May, two days after the Callahan encounter, he faced Jack Reardon, another 'no-decision' match, though on this occasion Welsh was given the bout by the press. This was followed by a win over Kid Gleason, and a second-round stoppage of Mike Loughlin. The 15 June saw a rematch with Chicago native Frank Carsey, which after the full six rounds it was again declared a 'no-decision', but with the press siding with Carsey. Carsey and Welsh would later become close friends over the years, with Carsey becoming his sparring partner, and was part of Welsh's corner team during his big fights.

Welsh finished June with a gruelling win over Billy Glover, before facing Young Erne, an intelligent boxer from Philadelphia. The match against Young Erne quickly turned into a slugging contest with both men forgetting their defensive strategies for an all-out attacking contest. The crowd were well entertained in a six-round bout, which the press gave to Welsh. The next contest was to be his first twenty-round match and his first professional fight outside Philadelphia, in Dayton, Ohio, against Australian lightweight champion Hock Keys. Welsh injured his favoured right hand in the sixth round, forcing him to box left-handed for the next eleven rounds, and won the match by technical knockout after downing Keys twice in the sixteenth round, and again in the seventeenth.

After the defeat of Hock Keys, Welsh took a month break, partly due to a failed show by Tim Callahan. He faced Jimmy Dunn on 31 August, in a six-round bout that went all the way, the press favouring Dunn. Welsh took another extended break, and when he returned to the ring, both he and Dunn agreed to another encounter, this time a twenty-round match at Dayton. The contest went the distance, with the referee declaring the match a draw, which enraged the crowd.

He fought twice more in America before the end of the year, both six-round results given to Welsh by the press: against Willie Moody on 23 November and then Kid Gleeson in December. Welsh now had a fine record behind him, but a few days after the Gleeson fight, he received news from Wales that his mother was seriously ill, and with Fanny still in New York, he returned to Britain on the Etruria.

First British fights, 1907
When Welsh returned to Britain, he was still an unknown, even in boxing circles. Despite his mother's illness Welsh arranged boxing matches in Britain, his first was against Seaman Arthur Hayes, a six-round match held at the National Sporting Club (NSC) in London. Welsh took the contest on points and followed this up with another points victory at the NSC, this time a 15-round bout against Young Joseph. To this point, Welsh had never fought in his home country, and to introduce himself to a Welsh audience, a display was arranged at the Park Gymnastic Club in Pontypridd on 17 April 1907. No opponent of sufficient calibre was available to fight, so he took on three local boxers. All three men lasted no more than three rounds.

On 21 May, Welsh took part in a fight against Johnny Owens of Aberaman, unofficial lightweight champion of Wales. The contest was for a purse of £50 and the Welsh lightweight title, though as a spectacle the match was a disappointment, with Welsh in complete control of the bout from the second round. After a two-month break, Welsh's next fight was a win over Sid Russell of Cheltenham on 18 July; and the next day appeared at an exhibition bout at Pontypridd, where he sparred with Jim Driscoll a fighter who would play a prominent part in Welsh's boxing career. After a win over Young Lilly in August, he followed this with a victory over former amateur featherweight champion, Dick Lee. A few days later at the St. Mary Hill Fair at Pencoed in Wales, Welsh and Driscoll fought in their first recorded match. Driscoll was working for the Frank Guess Boxing Booth at the fair, when Welsh accepted the barker's offer of £1 if he could last six rounds with Driscoll. In Welsh's previous fight Driscoll had been part of Welsh's corner, so it came as some surprise to Driscoll when his friend was over enthusiastic in the challenge, attacking him with kidney and rabbit punches. Driscoll never forgave Welsh for taking such liberties.

After winning a rematch against Seaman Hayes on 7 September, Welsh was invited to a private fight arranged by local industrialists for a fee of £100 plus a large purse. Some individuals had felt that Welsh had embraced America too much, and had undertaken too many 'Yankee' mannerisms, forgetting his home country. The fight was arranged to test Welsh, and they chose Joe White, a Swiss-Canadian who had also learnt his boxing art in the United States, but was now living in Cardiff. The fight took place in a converted loft in front of a select crowd of about sixty, who were balloted to gain their tickets. The fight went to sixteen rounds before White, who had suffered since the eleventh, threw in the towel.

Welsh's final fight in Britain until 1910, took place in Pontypridd on 3 October, when he faced two opponents on the same night. He stopped both in five rounds, first beating Gunnar Hart, the welterweight champion of the Royal Navy; then Arthur Ellis. Welsh never fought competitively in Pontypridd again. On 4 October, Welsh left for America, catching the train to Liverpool before taking the Lusitania to New York.

An insight into Welsh's personality was recorded in a legal case he raised which was concluded after he had left for the States. Welsh took the case against one of the three boys he travelled to Canada with in 1902, claiming that he had given the defendant, David Davies, £8 for the cost of the trip. Davies denied having received the money, and knew nothing of the claim until meeting Welsh in Taff Street in June, who then threatened to 'knock him through a window if he didn't pay the money'. After testimonies from the other two emigrants who travelled with Davies and Welsh, the judge found in favour of Welsh.

Return to America and first international belt, 1907–1909
On arrival in the United States, Welsh met Fanny in New York and the two of them travelled to Philadelphia. On 2 November 1907, Welsh faced Cyclone Johnny Thompson at the National Athletic Club in the city. The six-round encounter ended in a 'no-decision' given by the press to Welsh. A similar result was given in the contest against a poor Boxer Kelly, before he faced Willie Fitzgerald at Spring Garden Athletic Club; another six-round bout given as a draw. Welsh then experienced his first American fight outside Pennsylvania when a bout was arranged between him and Dave Deshler at the Winnisemmet Club in Chelsea, Massachusetts. The ten-round bout went the distance, with Welsh victorious by points decision, and he was congratulated by Theodore Roosevelt, Jr. at the end of the match.

Welsh went on to beat Eddie Carter in Philadelphia on Christmas Day 1907, Kid Locke on 2 January and then Maurice Sayers at the Milwaukee Boxing Club. He then faced local Milwaukee boxer Charley Neary in a ten-round match, the decision going to the referee Al Bright, who called the encounter a draw. This was followed by a fight against Chicago boxer Packey McFarland, regarded as one of the greatest lightweight boxers in history, which McFarland won on points. The contest caused controversy after Welsh was floored in the fourth round following what is believed to be a low shot. The referee failed to see the offending blow, and the match continued. When the points decision was announced there was jeering from the crowd, and accusations of favouritism were made, as referee Malachy Hogan was a Chicago man and had previously favoured Chicago fighters.

With fan frustration after the McFarland match, a rematch was arranged for 4 July, with Welsh facing just one opponent in the four and a half months between the bouts, Phil Brock. Welsh was meant to fight Dick Hyland, but blood poisoning to the Welshman's hand meant the Hyland fight did not take place. The Brock encounter, held at Vernon, California, was Welsh's first 25-round bout and ended in a terribly one-sided victory with a plucky Brock losing on points.

The rematch with McFarland was set for 4 July, Independence Day, to coincide with the world lightweight title fight between champion Joe Gans and Battling Nelson held in California. The Welsh-McFarland fight was gaining much press attention, and this increased after fight promoter and owner of the Jeffries Arena, Jim Jeffries, had offered Gans a $20,000 purse to face the winner of the bout in August. Betting was heavy for the match, and was to be refereed by Jeffries himself. Fought over 25 rounds, Welsh had the upper hand for the first nineteen, but after an announcement was made that Nelson had won in California, Welsh's game slipped with McFarland taking control. In the final two rounds Welsh took a heavy beating and was knocked down to the canvas in the last round. At the end of the encounter the decision from the referee was a draw. McFarland took the result badly and launched into a vicious tirade of abuse towards Jeffries, though Welsh too thought he had done enough to win in the first two-thirds of the fight and sent a cablegram to Wales stating such.

After the McFarland draw, for the first time the American press began questioning Welsh's credentials as a champion contender, mainly due to his inability to finish off his opponent due to a lack of punching power. Welsh was hurt by the remarks that he was a 'snowflake puncher', and used his next three fights to prove his critics wrong. Johnny Murphy went the full twenty-five rounds but suffered a terrible beating, Frank Carsey was knocked out in round four, lying unconscious for five minutes; while Harry Trendall was laid out in the sixth.

Although Welsh was chasing Nelson for a title shot, Nelson took an eight-month sabbatical after winning his rematch in September over Gans. Around this time, Welsh received a promise of a fight from fellow Brit Johnny Summers for the European title, but the major challenger in California was Abe Attell, the featherweight champion of the world since 1906. Attell had run out of opponents, so after much advertising of the match, the two men met on 25 November 1911. Under stormy weather conditions, Welsh won by points in a fifteen-round match, with one newspaper reporting that although Attell did not lose his featherweight title, he did "lose the title that he has held for years, that being the cleverest man in the game".

Welsh followed up the Attell fight with a narrow victory over George Memsic in Los Angeles, before heading to New Orleans to take a points victory over Young Erne and then a knock-out win over Ray Bronson. Shortly after the Bronson fight, Welsh learned that Nelson had no intention of facing him, deciding to face three more opponents before retiring; none of these talks included Welsh. Welsh carried on fighting, with one final match in New Orleans against Young Donahue. It was an acrimonious affair before the bout started, and when Welsh rejected the referee before the match began, another referee was found, but was told to call a draw if no clear winner was apparent. When the fight reached its ten-round conclusion, the referee called a draw, much to Welsh's annoyance.

Welsh and Fanny headed East to New York, and on 7 May he made his New York debut against Johnny Frayne. The match went the full ten rounds, with the press giving Welsh the decision with a lukewarm report, comparing him unfavourably against Jim Driscoll. Welsh finished off his tour of America with far more convincing displays over Jack Goodman and Phil Brock. With his sights now on the Lonsdale Belt, Welsh travelled back to Britain.

On his arrival at Cardiff on 19 June he was greeted by a throng of admirers; one of the first to greet him was Jim Driscoll. Cars had been arranged to take Welsh through Pontypridd, and he asked Driscoll to join him on the journey. Despite Pontypridd having a population of 32,000 at the time, reports were made that 80,000 people lined the streets to see their hero's arrival.

Welsh began his British return with an encounter with Young Joseph at the Pavilion in Mountain Ash, a 20-round match which only reached the eleventh after Young was disqualified for two low punches. Just over a month later, Welsh was back fighting in Mountain Ash, to face little known French lightweight Henri Piet. The press were unimpressed with the choice of opponent, but Piet gave a good account for himself before retiring in the twelfth. After Piet, Welsh faced Joe Fletcher from England; it was a terribly mismatched affair which resulted in negative press reports towards Welsh's choice of opponents. In truth there were very few fighters of a sufficient calibre to test Welsh in Britain, but on 8 November, Welsh got his chance to face Johnny Summers, for the British and European lightweight championship.

The Summers fight took part at the National Sporting Club in Covent Garden, with a purse of £2,200 and the Lonsdale Belt at stake. Welsh took control in the first round and never let Summers into the fight. One reporter counted 200 successful blows to Summers head during the match, and he was bleeding as early as the third round. During the fight, some members of the crowd jeered Welsh's use of the kidney punch, which although not outlawed at the time was seen as unsporting; he was also cautioned by the referee for the use of his head in the fifth. The fight went the distance, with Welsh winning on points; in taking the Lonsdale Belt he was the pride of Wales and America, but many in the boxing fraternity of England saw in Welsh a cynical, cold and cruel fighter.

McFarland, Driscoll and Wells, 1910–1911
Welsh took a break away from boxing after winning the Lonsdale Belt, earning good money making theatrical appearances at music halls in London, but a chance meeting with Packy McFarland led to a match being arranged between them. Welsh warmed up for the bout with a win over Jack Daniels, before facing McFarland for the third time, now on British soil at Covent Garden. The match was billed as the "Light-weight Championship of the World", but that title was now held by Ad Wolgast who had beaten Battling Nelson in a shock win in February. McFarland started the fight well, and most reporters gave him the first nine rounds, after that Welsh took most of the rounds, though in the eyes of the British press he failed to claw back the advantage McFarland had opened up in the early rounds. Although the result after twenty rounds was a draw, the British newspapers reported that McFarland had been robbed of a victory.

In the summer of 1910, Welsh was finding it difficult to find a fight. Wolgast was pricing himself out of the market, McFarland could not reach the weight and the National Sporting Centre could not find a credible contender to challenge for the Lonsdale Belt. Jim Driscoll, who had earlier won the flyweight Lonsdale Belt, was in a similar situation and a highly anticipated match was arranged between them. Two uninspiring fights were arranged before the Driscoll encounter in December, a sixth round win over middleweight Joe Heathcote and then a ninth round stoppage over Dick Bailey. A long build up to the game caused the relationship between Welsh and Driscoll to sour, and when they met to sign the contracts, an argument broke out between the two men over the choice of referee. Driscoll lost his temper with Welsh, became verbally abusive and stormed out of the meeting.

The fight took place on 20 December 1910 at the American Skating Ring in Cardiff, in front of a crowd of 10,000. Welsh started well, surprising the crowd with a straight back stance, out-jabbing Driscoll, but in the fifth he reverted to his normal crouched stance. Welsh's tactics changed and was now using his kidney punch on his opponent, amidst cries of "foul" from the crowd. He also tried to get in close to Driscoll, holding with one arm and delivering body blows with the other, which saw Driscoll adopt a similar tactic. By the eighth round Driscoll was coming into the match, and forced the fighting in the ninth. In the tenth round, Driscoll, becoming irritated at Welsh's clinches and illegal use of his shoulder, rushed Welsh and head butted him on the chin. It was an obvious foul, the referee, Arthur Frederick Bettinson, quickly entered the ring and disqualified Driscoll. The end of the fight was mired further when men from each of the boxers' corners began arguing before coming to blows, which saw the police entering the ring.

In early 1911, Welsh was about to set off for the United States when Matt Wells, a little-known British boxer who had recently turned professional, challenged him for his title. Welsh accepted, but was unprepared for Wells, who had been studying Welsh for the last eighteen months. On 27 February 1911 Welsh entered the ring at Covent Garden to little cheer, with the crowd supporting Wells the underdog. Wells' tactics were finely executed and he built up a healthy lead by attacking Welsh from the first round, he then spent the second half of the match defending his body and his lead. When the twenty rounds were up, Wells was given the decision and the championship title. Welsh departed for America on 11 March 1911, no longer a champion.

Reclaiming the British lightweight title 1911–1913

Welsh's time in Britain had damaged his credibility in America, so he set out to make amends. An easy victory over Pal Moore in March was followed by a trip to California to face Matty Baldwin in San Francisco. Welsh won the Baldwin fight on points in a performance that was considered an excellent display of boxing. On 4 August 1911, after weeks of negotiation, it was announced that Wolgast would face Welsh on 30 November, Welsh's first attempt at the world title. The buildup was intense and both camps attempted to use the media to their advantage. Just days before the match, with tickets in high demand, the man named in the fight articles as the referee, Eddie Smith, died. This led to arguments between Welsh and Tom 'Ten per cent' Jones, Wolgast's manager, as both tried to get the most favourable replacement referee. When Jones and Welsh met each other by chance on Windward Avenue in Venice, California, the men came to a heated argument with Jones threatening that he would 'knock his [Welsh] block off'. A few days later, realising that he was in the weaker position as the challenger, Welsh accepted Jones' choice of referee, Jack Welch. On the eve of the big encounter, news reached Welsh that Wolgast had been taken to hospital with acute appendicitis and would be unable to fight for three months. Walgast's last-minute replacement Willie Ritchie took Welsh the full twenty rounds, and although he failed to beat the Welshman, the fight had many fans contemplating how Welsh would have fared against the champion.

In January 1912, Welsh dislocated his neck in a bout of wrestling. He was now unable to box and running low on money after living beyond his means. He left San Francisco in March, travelling to Canada where he took in an exhibition bout with Jack O'Brien, before heading to Chicago where he and Fanny stayed for two months. Welsh then decided to head to New York as to take in some six-round matches to earn some money. On the way through Buffalo he fought Jimmy Duffy, although about half a stone overweight, Welsh was given the bout by the press, and was at least making money again. While in Buffalo, Welsh visited his friend Elbert Hubbard and after long philosophical discussions, he returned to boxing with a new purpose, intent on regaining his British title. He fought three more times in America before he returned to Britain, two draws against Grover Hayes and a press decision over Phil Knight.

In September 1912, Welsh travelled back to Britain on the Mauritania. A rematch was planned with Wells for 11 November, and Welsh warmed up with a points win over Jack Langdon in Liverpool. Almost three weeks later he faced Wells at Covent Garden for a second time, but now as challenger. Wells took the first four rounds, but in the sixth round, Welsh landed a combination of punishing blows which slowed the champion down. By the tenth round the match was level, and as the match progressed Welsh took charge. At the end of the 20 round bout Welsh was declared European and British champion.

Just before his next fight, news came from America that Willie Ritchie had taken the world title from Wolgast, strengthening Welsh's case for a championship shot. Before he could return a British Empire title fight had been arranged against Australian Hughie Mehegan. The encounter went the full 20 rounds, and although Welsh won on points he took a severe beating, complaining he found it difficult to sleep from the pain three or four days after the fight.

In early January 1913, Welsh's mother, who had been ill for some time, died. He gave up his immediate plans to chase Willie Ritchie and stayed in Wales for a while to be near his family. He fought four more fights in Britain, beginning with a home contest in Aberdare against Frenchman Paul Brevieres, who was stopped in the third. Then he took a points win over Young Nipper, a successful defence of his European title against Raymond Vittet, finishing with a points win over Eddie Beattie. The three final fights were conducted within seven days, and Welsh almost paid the price for such a challenging schedule when Beattie knocked him down for nine seconds in the ninth.

World title bid 1913–1914

When Welsh returned to America he was intent on fighting Ritchie, having failed to meet both Nelson and Wolgast. He employed the services of Harry Pollok, one of New York's most flamboyant sports impresarios. When Welsh and Fanny arrived in New York on 29 March 1913, Pollok was there orchestrating the reporters and photographers. Even with Pollack's help Ritchie was difficult to commit. Champions tended to stick to the East Coast, fighting in six round contests where the 'no-decision' contests meant the only way the title could be lost would be through a knockout. When Welsh arrived in New York, Billy Dolan, Ritchie's manager, announced that the champion would not be fighting for four months as he was touring Europe to fulfil theatrical commitments.

In preparation of a possible title bid on Ritchie's return, Welsh started his build up on 28 April by going the distance with Al Ketchell in Bridgeport. He then headed north to Canada to take the press decisions over Jack Redmond on 16 May and Kid Scaler on 24 May. These fights were followed by bouts against Billy Farrell in Moose Jaw, Ray Campbell and Young Jack O'Brien in Vancouver and then Martin Murphy in Fernie, British Columbia. In early July Welsh broke off his Canadian tour to watch Ritchie's return to the ring. It was an unimpressive display over 'Mexican' Joe Rivers, saved only by a knockout in the eleventh. During this period, to insure his name stayed in the papers, Welsh revealed that he and Fanny Weston had actually been married since 1905, a secret kept from all but the closest family members. This was followed by a stunt to break the Canadian land speed record over a mile. Welsh sat in with 'Speed King' Bob Burman when he broke the record in 50.8 seconds in his Blitzen Benz.

Eventually a fight was arranged between Welsh and Ritchie to be fought in Vancouver on 4 September 1913, but when Welsh turned on his ankle in training the date was forced back to the 20th. Worse was to follow when the evening before the fight Ritchie left Vancouver, later citing unhappiness over the filming rights of the fight. Around the same time, a gold belt awarded to Welsh after he won the Commonwealth encounter with Mehegan, was stolen while on display at a tea room near his training quarters. The belt was recovered when an Australian, named Henry Beckett, was caught trying to smuggle it out of the country.

Welsh responded to his bad luck by throwing himself back into competitive fighting. With three months of the year left, he arranged five fights. The first two contests, in Montana, against Fighting Dick Hyland and Leo Kossick were won on points decisions. These was followed with a match against Milburn Saylor who was disqualified in the ninth for a low blow. He faced Phil Bloom in New York, the press decision favouring Welsh, before he returned to Canada for a knockout win over Canadian Champion Arthur Ellis. Back in the United States, Welsh, although struggling with his weight was able to best Johnny Dundee in New Orleans, followed by a points victory over Frank Whitney in Atlanta. Welsh continued his journey east, stopping at Philadelphia for a match against Sam Robideau. This would be his third win in three different cities in just ten days. Five days later on 15 January 1914 in Kansas City he faced Mickey Sheridan of Chicago, who underwent "thirty minutes of torture and considerable humiliation" in an easy points decision for Welsh. He faced two more opponents in January, Earl Fisher in Cincinnati on the 26th followed by Leo Kelly in Saint Louis on the 29th, both were press decisions for Welsh. With his weight now coming down and his bank account swelled, Welsh and Pollok refocused on Ritchie. The American sportswriters were calling Welsh a 'has-been', so the two men devised a new strategy, if they could not get Ritchie to agree to a bout, they would beat as many of Ritchie's credible contenders until he could no longer ignore Welsh.

The first target on his list was Mexican Joe Rivers, who had already had two failed attempts at the lightweight title. On his build-up to the match, Welsh suffered his first defeat since 1911, when Jimmy Duffy took the press decision over eight rounds in Saint Louis. Undeterred he continued his preparation for the contest with Rivers on 17 March in Vernon. Rivers started as favourite, but his inexperience showed and Welsh dominated the entire fight winning on points. After the fight, at a celebratory dinner, Welsh was shown a newspaper reporting King George V's enthusiasm for boxing. Welsh wrote to His Majesty thanking him for his support, the next day he received a royal response by telegram. Nearly every major newspaper in the United States and the United Kingdom printed the correspondence in full, giving Welsh much needed column space.

In the spring of 1914, Welsh contacted Ritchie and asked him if he would face him in England, providing he got a satisfactory guarantee of money. Ritchie agreed that he would fight for the right money. Welsh cabled the Olympia Theatre, London and began booking advertising space. When Ritchie finally stated that he wanted $50,000, win lose or draw, Welsh said the price "would make a horse laugh", and was double what he was expecting. Despite this huge fee, England was desperate for a world champion and $40,000 was raised on the stipulation that Ritchie fought no other bouts in the meantime. Ritchie accepted the $40,000 but stated a fight was already planned and he would fight who he liked. The London syndicate relented to his demands. Before Ritchie's arranged fight with Charley White, Welsh took in two more encounters, beating Leach Cross on points and then Joe Mandot on press decision. All attention then switched to the White-Ritchie fight in Milwaukee. In almost the first punch that White connected with, Ritchie was in trouble. Staggered, Ritchie was laid open to a battering, but stayed on his feet until the end of the fight. White was declared winner, but as he had failed to stop Ritchie before the end of the match, he kept his world title. Pollok and Welsh then took a major gamble. They sent a telegram to Ritchie with the message, 'Promoters have called off match with you. Want us to meet White.', a bluff to force the Champion's hand. The following day Ritchie accepted a fee for $25,000 and $1,500 expenses to meet Welsh in London. The White fight had cost Ritchie almost $15,000.

Welsh and Pollok set off for Britain on the Imperator, and on his arrival on 12 June, he told reporters that he had received news from Fanny of the birth of his first child, Elizabeth. The fight took place on 7 July, and from the first round Welsh took control. It wasn't until the sixth when Ritchie caught Welsh on the jaw that he took a round. Welsh played defensive, but landed with jabbing blows to the head, while Ritchie kept looking for the massive knockout punch that would win the match. In the seventeenth round Ritchie was forced to up his game to find a winning punch, but failed to make significant contact before the end of the bout. Welsh was declared winner and lightweight boxing champion of the world, with the consensus around the ring that Welsh took ten rounds, Ritchie five and five were even. After the fight the new champion retired to The Waldorf Hilton, London to see his daughter for the first time.

Championship years and World War I

Just 25 days after becoming lightweight champion, Germany declared war on Russia, and the Great War began. His expected payout touring theatres was curtailed and he lost more than $50,000 in music hall engagements alone. Thanks to a manager of the White Star Line, he, Fanny and Elizabeth obtained first class passage to America on the Olympic. In some sections of the sporting press he was accused of cowardice for not joining the British Army. Welsh countered that he undertook numerous engagements to rally support for troops and stated "I can do far more for my country out of the trenches than in them."

In 1914 only two U.S. states allowed twenty round championship bouts to a verdict, Colorado and Louisiana, and no promoters in either state were offering large enough purses to risk losing the championship title for. To earn as much money as he could from being the champion, Welsh fought in as many ten round 'no verdict' matches as he could. As long as he was on his feet at the end of the ten rounds, he could not lose his title. Still, Welsh wanted to show he was not going to choose soft opposition and began a series of bouts against serious contenders. His first defence was against Matty Baldwin on 27 October in Boston, a match he won on points. This was followed six days later by a contest against Al Wolgast, the former champion who had avoided Welsh when he had the title to lose. The fight was a near sell out at Madison Square Garden in New York, with the crowd firmly behind Wolgast. Although the first few rounds were fairly even between the two fighters, at the end of the fifth round Wolgast blocked an uppercut with his right arm. The blow broke his ulna three inches (76 mm) above the wrist, forcing Wolgast to box on with just his left hand. Wolgast kept on fighting but could not continue after the eighth.

A week later Welsh faced Charley White, the man most sports-writers believed was the natural contender for the lightweight title. The ten round bout, held in Milwaukee, was a one-sided affair with Welsh landing four times as many punches as White. Despite White having the stronger punch, it was not until the tenth that he managed to draw blood, and many writers failed to give him even one round.

Welsh was expected to retire in 1915, with Harry Pollok stating that he planned to fight on four more occasions before leaving the sport. However, he continued fighting and retained the title until May 1917, when he was knocked out at the Manhattan Athletic Club by Benny Leonard, the first time in his career that he had been stopped. Leonard was deemed to have controlled the fight. After being floored in the ninth round, Welsh had risen back to his feet and absorbed even more blows before the referee called a halt to the bout.

Later life

Welsh retired from boxing after a defeat by Archie Walker in 1922, but retired as a wealthy man. Before he lost to Leonard in 1917, Welsh bought a farm on Long Hill in Chatham Township, New Jersey. His idea was to turn it into a health spa, and on 11 August 1917 a host of celebrities and dignitaries were invited to its opening. One of the guests, Bat Masterson, described Long Hill as a 'palatial home sitting high upon a hill, like an acropolis'.

Welsh found Long Hill a poor distraction and thought of joining the British forces, but was persuaded out of the idea by Fanny. Instead he joined the United States Army, serving as a lieutenant and was consigned to the Walter Reed Hospital where he helped rehabilitate disabled veterans.

In 1918 Welsh was struggling with Long Hill and decided he wanted rid of it. Welsh had spent $150,000 on Long Hill, his entire life's earnings, and he placed it on the market for $20,000 cash as his business was close to collapse. He was still unable to find a buyer. Welsh's dream was to earn and run a health farm, held since his first days in America; now with his dream in tatters his life began to disintegrate. On 11 October 1919, Welsh was the only diner in a restaurant on 50th and Broadway, when by coincidence Harry Pollok walked in. The men became violent, and a fight ensued which ended with Pollok being rushed to the Polyclinic Hospital with half his right ear in an ice bucket. Pollok swore out a warrant against Welsh who was arrested upon complaint that he had bitten his former manager's ear in half. Welsh denied the charges and after Pollok failed to appear to press the charge for a third time, the case was dismissed.

In 1920 he was discharged from his duties at Walter Reed Hospital having reached the rank of captain. He returned to Long Hill, and with his money dwindling made the decision to return to the ring. After six months of preparation he faced 'Kid' Green on 28 December 1920. Despite the three and a half-year absence from the ring, Welsh was in good shape and took only four rounds to beat Green; though he had switched his trademark defensive boxing to a heavier brawling style. Welsh then fought twice in May 1921, against Willie Jackson and Kid Murphy, both wins; but the most notable event regarding the bouts was the appearance of heavyweight champion Jack Dempsey, who was spending time relaxing at Welsh's health farm. After two more fights in 1921, both in Canada, Welsh returned to New York to face Archie Walker in April 1922. The fight was a sporting disaster for Welsh, losing seven of the ten rounds, and by the tenth he was being chased around the ring as he covered himself up. It was a pitiful display and Welsh never stepped into a professional ring again.

By 1923, during Prohibition, Long Hill was attracting more guests for its supply of home-brewed ciders and beers than its sporting facilities. While in 1924, through their mutual acquaintance of Ring Lardner, F. Scott Fitzgerald turned up at the farm and sparred three rounds with Welsh. In 1924, Welsh was back in court, after he was involved in a car collision caused by him driving his vehicle on the wrong side of the road. Welsh began looking for other ventures to take him away from the health farm, and in 1925 he rejoined the US Army, becoming a boxing instructor at the Plattsburg Barracks in upstate New York. While in the forces he placed an advertisement for a manager to run Long Hill, which was accepted by neighbour and friend, Sidky Bey, and his wife Hranoush, known as Madame Bey. With strict curfew hours and a no-alcohol policy, Madame Bey made the farm a success, and Long Hill became an important training venue for New York boxers. But her tenure at the farm ended acrimoniously, over an argument with boxer Battling Siki, who Welsh believed to be a bad influence. After discussing the matter with other boxers, Madame Bey left Long Hill and set up her own rival venue. With Welsh in the Army and Madame Bey gone, the farm fell into disrepair. Bey later recalled Welsh fondly, stating that he was a man who enjoyed having a good time, but was a terrible businessman.

In 1927, with Welsh unable to raise the capital to pay the mortgage on his Long Hill estate, the farm was sold to satisfy a mortgage of $30,000 even though it was valued at $150,000. With Long Hill lost, Fanny and Welsh separated, Fanny taking a job as a live-in housekeeper at the St Paul's Hotel on 60th Street, New York, a venue where she and Welsh once lived in a suite of apartments. Soon after, Welsh's health began to deteriorate and he began complaining of severe chest pains. His doctor reported that Welsh was depressed and was drinking too much. On 17 July 1927 Welsh appeared at the West Side Court in New York City, sporting a black-eye suffered in a street brawl. He faced a charge of disorderly conduct, after he came off worse in a drunken encounter with Edward Delaney of New York. The patrolman who saved Welsh from a serious beating assured the magistrate that it was a friendly fight and the charges were dismissed against both men.

On 28 July 1927 a maid at Hotel Sidney, discovered Welsh laid face downward in his pyjamas and bathrobe. He had died in the night. A doctor was called who opined that Welsh had died of a heart attack. On 13 October 1927, Welsh's old health farm was destroyed in a fire.

Legacy
Freddie Welsh was inducted into the 'Ring Boxing Hall of Fame' in 1960, the Welsh Sports Hall of Fame in 1994 and the 'International Boxing Hall of Fame' in 1997.

In 2008, Welsh was celebrated by Rhondda Cynon Taf council when it was decided to raise a blue plaque at his former boxing club to commemorate his life. The plaque was unveiled by Welsh boxer Dai Dower the following year.

Record
During the time Welsh boxed, scoring resulted in a large number of no-decision fights.  However, newspapers commonly reported a winner in the case of no-decision bouts. With that adjustment, Welsh's final record would be 110–25–15 with 32 KOs and 16 no-decisions.

Fighting style
During his career Welsh was often reported in the British press as having learned his boxing trade in America, and therefore he had an ungentlemanly style of boxing, especially when compared to the darling of the National Sporting Club, 'peerless' Jim Driscoll. Welsh had a history of boxing in his family, with his paternal grandfather being a mountain fighter.

Although Welsh is often criticised throughout his career as being unable to knock out his opponents, his style centred on his footwork and ability to avoid punishment. He was calm, elusive and able to frustrate those who faced him, especially heavy hitters. Welsh would often finish long fights without injury, while his opponents suffered heavy damage, and was described as "essentially a long-distance fighter".

Vegetarianism
Welsh, when talking to the press, always stated that he was a vegetarian. This was always received with a mixture of interest and jest from his opponent and the journalists. Welsh was a vegetarian for its health values, inspired by the writings of Bernarr Macfadden, and showed no interest in animal welfare. When Welsh beat Phil Brock, he received a telegram from Macfadden stating 'Mr. Welsh - Dear Sir: Hope you will go through the whole bunch of meat eaters'.

Although he preached the benefits of vegetarianism, he was not averse to eating meat if required. In an interview Welsh once stated, "I don't believe in a variety of cooked dishes. I eat as much raw food as possible, and this second meal consists of all sorts of vegetables, and for the main dish I have a macaroni and cheese, followed by fruit and nuts and a little rice or tapioca pudding. I find plenty of vegetable and fruits to choose from without touching meat at all. I am not a faddist, and, I eat meat when I cannot get anything else."

In his later life his adherence to vegetarianism slipped, and his difficulty in maintaining his weight after 1913 was credited to him switching diets. Welsh was known to slip away after training to secluded roadhouses where he would eat his favourite meal Chicken Maryland.

Selected publications

Training the Body and Brain to Win: What and How to Eat (1915)

Professional boxing record
All information in this section is derived from BoxRec, unless otherwise stated.

Official Record

All newspaper decisions are officially regarded as “no decision” bouts and are not counted to the win/loss/draw column.

Unofficial record

Record with the inclusion of newspaper decisions to the win/loss/draw column.

See also
List of Welsh boxing world champions
Lineal championship
List of British lightweight boxing champions
List of European Boxing Union lightweight champions

References

Bibliography

External links

 Retrieved on 24 January 2008
"Jim Driscoll v Freddie Welsh: 100 years on", BBC Sport, retrieved 29 January 2012

1886 births
1927 deaths
Sportspeople from Pontypridd
Welsh male boxers
American military personnel of World War I
Lightweight boxers
People associated with physical culture
International Boxing Hall of Fame inductees
European Boxing Union champions